Kanjiža (pronounced ) formerly Stara Kanjiža (formerly Kanizsa) is a town and municipality located in the North Banat District of the autonomous province of Vojvodina, Serbia. Kanjiža town has a population of 9,871, while the Kanjiža municipality has 25,343 inhabitants.

Geography
Although it belongs to North Banat District, territory of Kanjiža municipality is in fact located in the region of Bačka. The territory of the municipality is bordered by the river Tisa and the Novi Kneževac Municipality in the east, the Municipality of Senta in the south, the Municipality of Subotica in the west and the border with Hungary in the north. The proximity to the border, to the free-way and the river Tisa makes it an important location.

History
The town was mentioned in the Gesta Hungarorum chronicle under the name Kenesna and, according to the chronicle, it belonged to the duchy of Bulgarian duke Salan who ruled from Titel in the 9th century. In first written documents after Hungarian conquest of Central Europe, the town is mentioned as Cnesa or Kenesna. This name came from Slavic word knez 'prince'. In 1335, it was mentioned as Villa Canysa.

In the first half of the 16th century, the town was administered by the Eastern Hungarian Kingdom, until 1552 when it was administered by the Ottoman Empire (Sanjak of Çanad). From 1686 to 1918, the town was administered by the Habsburg monarchy. Initially, it was part of the Habsburg Military Frontier, but was placed under civil administration in 1751. In the beginning of Ottoman administration, local Hungarian population left from this area. During the Ottoman period and also during the first decades of Habsburg administration, the town was mainly populated by ethnic Serbs. Hungarian colonists from northern counties of the Kingdom of Hungary started to settle here in 1753 and they became dominant ethnic group in the town. Since 1918, the town was part of the Kingdom of Serbs, Croats and Slovenes (Yugoslavia) and subsequent South Slavic states.

Inhabited places

The municipality of Kanjiža includes the town and 12 villages. The villages are:
Adorjan (Adorján)
Doline (Völgyes)
Horgoš (Horgos)
Male Pijace (Kispiac)
Mali Pesak (Kishomok)
Martonoš (Martonos)
Novo Selo (Újfalu)
Orom (Orom)
Totovo Selo (Tóthfalu)
Trešnjevac (Oromhegyes)
Velebit
Zimonić (Ilonafalu)

Note: For the inhabited places with Hungarian ethnic majority, the names are also given in italics in Hungarian.

Demographics

According to the 2011 census results, the municipality of Kanjiža has a population of 25,343 inhabitants.

Ethnic groups
Almost all of the settlements in the municipality have Hungarian majorities except Velebit, which is predominantly Serbian.

The ethnic composition of the municipality:

Economy
The economy of Kanjiža is dominated by the Potisje-Tondach roof tile factory. Other firms are FIM Kanjiža, Keramika Kanjiža, various paprika refining firms, and a spa health center "Banja Kanjiža".

The following table gives a preview of total number of registered people employed in legal entities per their core activity (as of 2018):

Gallery

Notable citizens
Frank Arok, football player and former manager of the Socceroos
Ferenc Barath (in Hungarian), graphic artist.
Jozsef Beszedes (in Hungarian), Hungarian hydrotechnical engineer (19th century works).
Zoltan Bicskei (in Hungarian), film director and graphic artist.
Dragan Bošnjak, former Serbian football player
Tibor Harsanyi (in Hungarian), Hungarian composer.
Mika K. (Mirjana Kostic), Serbian singer and musician.
Đorđe Krstić, Serbian realist painter.
Josef Nadj (in French), choreographer, director and dancer.
Dan Reisinger, Israeli designer of graphics, exhibitions, and stage sets.
Otto Tolnai (in Hungarian), writer, poet, translator.

See also
List of Hungarian communities in Vojvodina

References

External links

 The official website of the municipality
 Center for Information and Development of the Tisa region
 History of Kanjiža 

 
Places in Bačka
Populated places in North Banat District
Municipalities and cities of Vojvodina
Spa towns in Serbia
Hungarian communities in Serbia
Towns in Serbia